Alida Vázquez (1929–2015) was a Mexican composer who lived and worked in the United States. Vázquez was born in Mexico City, and from 1941–47 attended the Conservatorio Nacional de Música. She studied piano with Esperanza Cruz de Vasconcelos and music theory with Julián Carrillo. She received a scholarship to attend Diller-Quaile Music School in New York City and also studied with Mario Davidovsky at City College. After completing her music studies, she studied journalism and worked as a music therapist. In 1976 she began teaching music at the Bank Street College of Education.

Works 
Vázquez has composed song cycles and works for solo instruments, chamber ensembles, electronic dance music and electro-acoustic works. Selected works include:

Acuarelas de México 1970
Piece for Violin and Piano 1970
Pieza para clarinete y piano 1971
Música para siete instrumentos 1974
Electronic Moods and Piano Sounds, 1977

References

1931 births
20th-century classical composers
Living people
Mexican women classical composers
Mexican classical composers
Mexican music educators
Women music educators
20th-century women composers